Governor General of New France was the vice-regal post in New France from 1663 until 1760, and it was the last French vice-regal post. It was replaced by the British post of Governor of the Province of Quebec following the fall of New France. While the districts of Montreal and Trois-Rivières had their own governors, the governor of the district of Quebec and the Governor General of New France were the same person. The role of the Governor was to serve and represent the king in New France.

List of governors general

See also

 Governor of Montreal
 Governor of Acadia
 Governor of Plaisance
 Governors of French Louisiana

 03
New France
New France
1663 establishments in New France
1760 disestablishments in New France